The 2019 K3 League Basic was the third and last season of the K3 League Basic. Eight teams competed in the league for 21 rounds. Ulsan Citizen joined the league in the 2019 season. For 2020, the former Korea National League was absorbed into the K League or K3 League and rebranding as K3 League and K4 League.

Competition format
The 2019 season ran from March to October. Eight teams competed in a single division. Each team played each other 3 times for a total of 21 games. After the regular season, the top two teams were directly promoted to the 2020 K3 League.

Clubs

In this year, the number of foregin players limition is changed.
Restricting the number of foreign players strictly to four per team, including a slot for a player from AFC countries. A team could use four foreign players on the field each game including at least one player from the AFC confederation.

Players name in bold indicates the player is registered during the mid-season transfer window.

League table

Results

Regular season

Matches 1–14

Matches 15–21

Playoffs

Season statistics

Top scorers

See also
 2019 Korean FA Cup
 2019 K League 1
 2019 K League 2
 2019 Korea National League
 2019 K3 League Advanced

Notes

References

2019 in South Korean football
K3 League (2007–2019) seasons
Fifth level football leagues in Asia